The 2003 Torneo Godó, also known by its sponsored name Open SEAT Godó, was a men's tennis tournament played on outdoor clay courts. It was the 51st edition of the Torneo Godó, and was part of the International Series Gold of the 2003 ATP Tour. It took place at the Real Club de Tenis Barcelona in Barcelona, Spain, from 21 April until 27 April 2003.  Second-seeded Carlos Moyá won the singles title after a retirement by Marat Safin in the final.

Finals

Singles

 Carlos Moyá defeated  Marat Safin, 5–7, 6–2, 6–2, 3–0, ret.
 It was Moya's 2nd singles title of the year, and his 13th overall.

Doubles

 Bob Bryan /  Mike Bryan defeated  Chris Haggard /  Robbie Koenig, 6–4, 6–3

References

External links
Official website
Singles draw
Doubles draw

 
2003 ATP Tour